The Saturday Evening Quill was a short-lived (1928–1930) African-American literary magazine of the Harlem Renaissance. It was founded by the journalist Eugene Gordon.

History
In 1925, Boston-based journalist Eugene Gordon organized an African-American literary group, the Saturday Evening Quill Club (also known as the Boston Quill Club). Its founding members included the writers Helene Johnson and Dorothy West. Out of this grew an annual literary magazine, Saturday Evening Quill, which Gordon edited. Only three issues were published, for the years 1928 to 1930. It was intended mainly for the benefit of club members, and only the third and final issue was available for sale to the public.

The Saturday Evening Quill published stories, poems, essays, and plays. In addition to Gordon, Johnson, and West themselves, it published such noted writers as Gertrude Schalk, Florida Ruffin Ridley, Edythe Mae Gordon, Lois Mailou Jones, Lewis Grandison Alexander, Alvira Hazzard, Alice E. Furlong, and Roscoe Wright (who also designed its monogram).

References

Further reading
 Davis, Cynthia, and Verner Mitchell. “Eugene Gordon, Dorothy West, and the Saturday Evening Quill Club.” CLA Journal 52:4 (June 2009): 393–408.

Magazines established in 1928
Harlem Renaissance
African-American magazines
Literary magazines published in the United States
Defunct magazines published in the United States
Magazines disestablished in 1930
Magazines published in New York City